This article gives a list of individuals who have been romantically or maritally coupled with a sibling. This list does not include coupled siblings in fiction, although ones from mythology and religion are included.

Terminology

There are many terms used to describe a romantic bond between siblings, including formal nomenclature such as adelphogamy, specific hyponyms such twincest, or slang terms like sibcest. In a heterosexual context, a female partner in such a relationship may be referred as a sister-wife. A similar incestuous arrangement which is non-monogamous can be referred as sister-swapping or brother-swapping, although this should not be confused with berdel, which describes the situation in which families exchange brides or bridegrooms.

History
While cousin marriage is legal in most countries, and avunculate marriage is legal in several, sexual relations between siblings are considered incestuous almost universally. Sibling incest is legally prohibited in most countries worldwide. It was historically practiced in ancient Egypt and Inca tribes.

Innate sexual aversion between siblings forms due to close association in childhood, in what is known as the Westermarck effect. Children who grow up together do not normally develop sexual attraction, even if they are unrelated, and conversely, siblings who were separated at a young age may develop sexual attraction. Thus, many cases of sibling incest, including accidental incest, concern siblings who were separated at birth or at a very young age.

List of coupled siblings

Religion and mythology
 Nüwa and her full brother Fuxi, in Chinese mythology
 Mashya and Mashyana in Zoroastrian mythology
 Freyr and his twin sister Freyja
 Halga and his daughter Yrsa
 King Arthur and his half-sister Morgause

In Egyptian mythology
 Nut and her full brother Geb
 Shu and his full sister Tefnut
 Osiris and his full sister Isis
 Set and his full sister Nephthys

In Abrahamic religions
 Abraham and his half sister Sarah

In Japanese mythology
 Izanami and her twin brother Izanagi
 Amaterasu and her full brother Tsukuyomi

In Greek mythology
 Uranus and his full sister Gaia
 Cronus and his full sister Rhea
 Phoebe and her full brother Coeus
 Hyperion and his full sister Theia
 Oceanus and his full sister Tethys
 Ceto and her full brother Phorcys
 Nyx and her full brother Erebus
 Zeus and his full sisters Hera and Demeter
 Demeter and her full brothers Zeus and Poseidon
 Aphrodite and her half-brothers Ares, Hephaestus, Hermes, and Dionysus
 Macareus (son of Aeolus) and his full sister Canace
 Heracles and his half-sister Hebe

Monarchs

In Ancient Egypt
 Smenkhkare and his half sister Meritaten
 Djet and his full sister Merneith
 Merneptah and his full sister Isetnofret II
 Menkaure and his full sister Khamerernebty II
 Seti II and his half-sister Twosret
 Ahmose I and his full sister Ahmose-Nefertari and his half-sister Ahmose-Henuttamehu
 Seqenenre Tao and his full sisters Ahhotep I and Sitdjehuti and his half-sister Ahmose Inhapy
 Amenhotep I and his full sister Ahmose-Meritamun
 Thutmose I and his half-sister Ahmose
 Thutmose II and his half-sister Hatshepsut
 Akhenaten and an unnamed sister
 Tutankhamun and his half-sister Ankhesenamun
 Djoser and his half-sister Hetephernebti
 Djedefre and his full sister Hetepheres II, who was previously married to her half-brother Kawab
 Pepi II Neferkare and his half-sisters Iput II and Ankhesenpepi III
 Intef III and his half-sister Iah
 Mentuhotep II and his full sister Neferu II
 Senusret I and his half-sister Neferu III
 Senusret II and his sisters Khenemetneferhedjet I, Nofret II, Itaweret, and Khenmet
 Nubkhaes and her half-brother Sobekemsaf
 Ramesses III and his half-sister Tyti
 Ramesses IV and his half-sister Duatentopet
 Psusennes I and his full sister Mutnedjmet
 Pinedjem II and his full sister Isetemkheb D
 Takelot II and his half-sister Karomama II
 Alara of Kush and his half-sister Kasaqa
 Kashta and his full sister Pebatjma
 Tantamani and his full sisters Piankharty and Setemkheb H
 Apries and his full sister Ankhnesneferibre
 Piye and his half-sisters Peksater and Khensa
 Shebitku and his half-sister Arty

In classical antiquity
 Artemisia II of Caria and her full brother Mausolus
 Ada of Caria and her full brother Idrieus
 Arsinoe II and her full brother Ptolemy II Philadelphus and half-brother Ptolemy Ceraunus
 Erato of Armenia and her full brother Tigranes IV
 Boran and her full brother Kavad II
 Darius II and his half-sister, Parysatis
 Cambyses II and two of his sisters, Atossa and Roxanne
 Mithridates IV of Pontus and his full sister Laodice
 Mithridates VI Eupator and his full sister Laodice
 Antiochus III of Commagene and his full sister Iotopa
 Antiochus IV of Commagene and his full sister Iotopa
 Laodice and her full brother Mithridates VI of Pontus
 Ptolemy IV Philopator and his full sister Arsinoe III of Egypt
 Cleopatra II and her full brothers Ptolemy VI Philometor and Ptolemy VIII Physcon
 Ptolemy IX Soter and his full sisters Cleopatra IV and Cleopatra Selene, who later married her other full brother Ptolemy X Alexander I.
 Ptolemy XI Alexander II and his possible half-sister Berenice III
 Ptolemy XII Auletes and his full sister Cleopatra V
 Cleopatra VII and her full brothers Ptolemy XIII Theos Philopator and Ptolemy XIV Philopator
 Laodice IV and her full brothers Antiochus, Seleucus IV Philopator, and Antiochus IV Epiphanes
 Demetrius I Soter and his full sister Laodice V
 Alexander II of Epirus and his half-sister Olympias II of Epirus

In Inca Peru
 Manco Cápac and his full sister Mama Ocllo
 Sinchi Roca and his half-sister Mama Cura
 Topa Inca Yupanqui and his full sister Mama Ocllo Coya
 Sayri Túpac and his full sister Cusi Huarcay
 Cura Ocllo and her full brother Manco Inca Yupanqui
 Huayna Capac and his full sisters Kuya Kusi Rimay and Kuya Rahua Ocllo
 Huáscar and his full sister Chuqui Huipa
 Atahualpa and his half-sister Coya Asarpay

In East Asia
 Jeongjong of Goryeo and his half-sister (10th century)
 Gwangjong of Goryeo and his half-sister Daemok (10th century)
 Deokjong of Goryeo and his half-sisters Gyeongseong and Hyosa (11th century)
 Munjong of Goryeo and his half-sister Inpyeong (11th century)
 Nyaungyan Min of Burma and his half-sister Khin Hpone Myint (16th century)
 Kyawswa of Pagan and his half-sister Mi Saw U
 Uzana I of Pinya and his half-sister Atula Maha Dhamma Dewi of Pinya
 Binnya E Law and his half-sister Sanda Min Hla
 Anaukpetlun and his 3 half-sisters
 Chulalongkorn and his half-sisters Sunandha Kumariratana, Savang Vadhana, Saovabha Phongsri, Sukhumala Marasri, Daksinajar, and Thaksincha (19th century)
 Sisavang Vong and his half-sisters Khamphane and Princess Khamtouan (20th century)

In Japan
 Emperor Nintoku and his 2 half-sisters Princess Yata and Uji no Wakiiratsume
 Prince Kinashi no Karu and his full sister Princess Karu no Ōiratsume (5th century)
 Emperor Bidatsu and his half-sister Empress Suiko (6th century)
 Emperor Yōmei and his half-sister Anahobe no Hashihito (6th century)
 Emperor Kanmu and his half-sister Princess Sakahito (8th century)
 Emperor Heizei and 3 half-sisters
 Emperor Junna and his half-sister Princess Koshi (9th century)
 Emperor Saga and his half-sister Princess Takatsu
 Emperor Seiwa and his half-sister Minamoto no Seishi
 Emperor Kōkaku and his adopted sister Princess Yoshiko

In the Hawaiian Islands
 Kaumualii and his half-sister Kaapuwai Kapuaamohu
 Keliimaikai and his half-sister Kiilaweau
 Keōua and his half-sister Manono I
 Kalola Pupuka and her full brother Kamehamehanui Ailuau
 Lanakawai and his half-sister Kalohialiiokawai
 Laau and his full sister Kukamolimaulialoha
 Pilikaaiea and his full sister Hina-au-kekele
 Hinaauamai and her full brother Koa
 Kukohou and his half-sister Hineuki
 Kahaimoelea and his half-sister Kapoakauluhailaa
 Kalaunuiohua and his half-sister Kaheka
 Kahoukapu and his full sister Hukulani
 Keaweōpala and his half-sister Hākau
 Kauakahiakua and his full sister Kāneikapōleikauila
 Kalaninuiamamao and his half-sister Kekaulike-i-Kawekiuonalani
 Keaweīkekahialiiokamoku and his half-sister Kalanikauleleiaiwi
 Kekuiapoiwa I and her half-brother Kekaulike
 Umi-a-Liloa and his half-sister Alii Kapukini-a-Liloa
 Kukailani and his half-sister Kaohukiokalani
 Keākealanikāne and his half-sisters, Alii Kealiiokalani and Kealiiokalani
 Keākealaniwahine and her half-brother Chief Kane-i-Kauaiwilani
 Haae-a-Mahi and his half-sister Kekelakekeokalani
 Keawepoepoe and his full sister Kanoena
 Kīwalaō and his half-sister Kekuiapoiwa Liliha
 Kamehameha II and his half-sisters Kamāmalu, Kīnau, and Kekāuluohi
 Kamehameha III and his full sister Nahienaena

In medieval and renaissance Europe
 John V of Armagnac and his full sister Isabelle of Armagnac (15th century)
 Julien and Marguerite de Ravalet, full siblings (16th century)

Suspected/disputed
 Caligula and his full sisters Julia Livilla, Drusilla, and Agrippina the Younger
 Herod Agrippa II and his full sister Berenice (daughter of Herod Agrippa)
 Lord Byron and his half-sister Augusta Leigh
 Lucrezia Borgia and her full brother Cesare Borgia

Other 
 Patrick Stübing and his full sister Susan Karolewski
 George of Izla and his sister Maria

See also
 Avunculate marriage
 Consanguinity
 Cousin marriage
 List of coupled cousins

References

Bibliography 

 
 
 
 
 
 
 
 
 
 
 
 
 

Lists of sibling groups
Incest
Lists of couples